Harrison Carlyon (born 23 January 2001) is a Jersey international cricketer. In October 2016 Carlyon was selected for Jersey's squad for the 2016 ICC World Cricket League Division Four in Los Angeles. He played in Jersey's first fixture of the tournament against Oman. At the age of fifteen, he became the youngest player to represent Jersey in an international cricket match, breaking the previous record held by teammate Jonty Jenner.

In the final match for Jersey in the Division Four tournament, the fifth-place playoff against Italy, he played alongside his father and team manager, Tony Carlyon. Injuries in the Jersey team forced his father to play, becoming the first father and son to play together in an international match for Jersey.

In April 2018, he was named in Jersey's squad for the 2018 ICC World Cricket League Division Four tournament in Malaysia. In August 2018, he was named in Jersey's squad for the 2018–19 ICC World Twenty20 Europe Qualifier tournament in the Netherlands.

In May 2019, he was named in Jersey's squad for the 2019 T20 Inter-Insular Cup against Guernsey. The same month, he was named in Jersey's squad for the Regional Finals of the 2018–19 ICC T20 World Cup Europe Qualifier tournament in Guernsey. He made his Twenty20 International (T20I) debut for Jersey against Guernsey on 1 June 2019.

In July 2019, Carlyon captained Jersey's under-19 team for the Under-19 Cricket World Cup qualification tournament. On 31 July 2019, in Jersey's nine wicket win against France, Carlyon scored 107 runs.

In September 2019, he was named in Jersey's squad for the 2019 ICC T20 World Cup Qualifier tournament in the United Arab Emirates.  In November 2019, he was named in Jersey's squad for the Cricket World Cup Challenge League B tournament in Oman. He made his List A debut, for Jersey against Uganda, on 2 December 2019.

In October 2021, Carlyon was named in Jersey's T20I squad for the Regional Final of the 2021 ICC Men's T20 World Cup Europe Qualifier tournament.

References

External links
 

2001 births
Living people
Jersey cricketers
Jersey Twenty20 International cricketers
Place of birth missing (living people)